SVE may refer to:

 Scalable vector extension, a feature of microprocessor ARM architecture
 Société de Véhicules Electriques, a joint venture for the development of hybrid vehicles 
 Soil vapor extraction, an in situ process for soil remediation
 Sharon Van Etten, American singer-songwriter and actress
 Special visceral efferent, nerves that supply muscles
 Specialty Vehicle Engineering, a high-performance automobile group within Chrysler
 Susanville Municipal Airport (IATA airport code), near Susanville, California